is a Japanese light novel series written by Tenichi. The series originated on the Shōsetsuka ni Narō website in April 2018, before being published in print with illustrations by Suzunosuke by Ichijinsha beginning in June 2019. A manga adaptation, illustrated by Bunko Matsuura, was serialized on the Zero-Sum Online website between March 2020 and March 2022. An anime television series adaptation by OLM is set to air in July 2023.

Characters

Pride is the main protagonist, being a reincarnator. The original Pride was a selfish woman who callously abused everyone. The current Pride uses her memory of the original story to save and protect everyone that would have been abused by her; unintentionally causing them to have glimpses of the original timeline.

Media

Light novel
Written by Tenichi, the series began serialization on the novel posting website Shōsetsuka ni Narō on April 19, 2018. The series was later acquired by Ichijinsha, who began publishing the series in print with illustrations by Suzunosuke on June 4, 2019. As of November 2022, six volumes have been released.

In June 2021, Seven Seas Entertainment announced that they licensed the series for English publication.

Volume list

Manga
A manga adaptation, illustrated by Bunko Matsuura, was serialized on Ichijinsha's Zero-Sum Online website from March 19, 2020, to March 18, 2022. As of January 2022, the series' individual chapters have been collected into three tankōbon volumes. In October 2022, it was announced that the manga adaptation had been cancelled due to the poor health of the artist, and that a new serialization is being planned.

Seven Seas Entertainment is also publishing the manga adaptation in English.

Volume list

Anime
An anime television series adaptation was announced on October 28, 2022. It is set to be produced by OLM and directed by Norio Nitta, with Deko Akao writing the scripts, Hitomi Kōno designing the characters, and Hanae Nakamura, Tatsuhiko Saiki, Kanade Sakuma, and Junko Nakajima composing the music. It is set to premiere in July 2023. Sentai Filmworks licensed the series, and will be streaming it on Hidive.

Reception
In 2021, the manga adaptation was nominated for the Next Manga Awards in the web category.

References

External links
  at Shōsetsuka ni Narō 
  
  
 

2019 Japanese novels
2023 anime television series debuts
Anime and manga based on light novels
Fantasy anime and manga
Fiction about reincarnation
Ichijinsha manga
Isekai anime and manga
Isekai novels and light novels
Japanese fantasy novels
Japanese webcomics
Light novels
Light novels first published online
OLM, Inc.
Sentai Filmworks
Seven Seas Entertainment titles
Shōjo manga
Shōsetsuka ni Narō
Webcomics in print